Celia Pearce (born September 6, 1961) is an American game designer currently teaching at Northeastern University as an associate professor. She is a co-founder and current Festival Chair of IndieCade, an international festival of independent games. She is currently a professor at Northeastern University and occasionally talks and shows games at art and game events such as Different Games and Incubate Arcade.

Life and career 
Pearce previously held a position at the Georgia Institute of Technology as Head of the Experimental Game Lab and Emergent Game Group. She has also worked as a part of different conventions such as IndieCade and Women in Games.

Pearce's work focuses on the creation and moderation of virtual worlds and networks as well as covers topics such as cosplay, role-playing, and gender representation in video games. In her profession, Pearce has also worked with other game designers such as Tracy Fullerton, Will Wright, and Eric Zimmerman.

Games

Candy Crusher (2015) 
 A strategic board game in which players rearrange and smash candy pieces with hammers in order to create the longest row. The game was designed in collaboration with Jeanie Choi (an MFA masters student in Interdisciplinary Arts at Northeastern).

CLITar (2016) 
 A plush toy covered in pompoms in which the player has to find hidden buttons between the pompoms which then play synthesized woman's noises through a speaker in the top of the CLITar.

eBee (2016) 
 An electronic quilting game in which players build circuits with quilted hexagons that connect the central hub with a power source.

Written works 
The Interactive Book: A Guide to the Interactive Revolution (1997)
A book exploring the history and potential of digital and interactive media.
Playing Dress-Up: Costumes, Roleplay and Imagination (2007)
A co-authored essay exploring dressing up as a historically female practice and how it fits into modern entertainment means.
Communities of Play (2011)
An exploration of emergent fan cultures in digital worlds with integrated player networks.
Ethnography and Virtual Worlds (2012) 
A guide meant for those interested in studying online virtual worlds using scientific methods and descriptions. Co-authored with Tom Boellstorff, Bonnie Nardi, and T. L. Taylor.

References

Living people
1961 births
American game designers
Northeastern University faculty
American women game designers
American women academics
21st-century American women